Alvar Rantalahti (July 29, 1913 – January 30, 2007) was a Finnish cross-country skier who competed in the late 1930s. He won a silver medal at the 1938 FIS Nordic World Ski Championships in the 50 km.

Cross-country skiing results
All results are sourced from the International Ski Federation (FIS).

World Championships
 1 medal – (1 silver)

References

External links

1913 births
Finnish male cross-country skiers
2007 deaths
FIS Nordic World Ski Championships medalists in cross-country skiing
20th-century Finnish people